Shanvi Srivastava (born 8 December 1993) is an Indian actress and model who works predominantly in Kannada films and a few Telugu and Malayalam films.

Early life
Srivastava was born on 8 December 1993, in Varanasi, she did her schooling at Children College Azamgarh, Uttar Pradesh and graduation at the Thakur College of Science and Commerce in Mumbai and completed her B.Com degree in 2016. Srivastava has one elder brother and one elder sister, actress Vidisha.

Career
Srivastava made her debut in 2012 in B. Jaya's Lovely while she was still studying. In her second Telugu film Adda she was seen as a fashion designing student and her performance was well received by critics. The Times of India wrote, "In the lengthy role that she has, Shanvi gets all her expressions right". She was then signed by Ram Gopal Varma to play a brief role as Vishnu Manchu's romantic interest in his Telugu political drama Rowdy. 

In 2014, she made her Kannada debut with the horror comedy film Chandralekha and received positive reviews for her performance. In 2015, she won the South Indian International Movie Awards and was also nominated for a Filmfare Award for Best Actress - Kannada for Masterpiece (2015 film) directed by Manju Mandavya. She was also nominated for the Filmfare Best Actress Kannada and won the SIIMA Award for Best Actor in lead role (Female)- Kannada for the movie Tarak. 

Srivastava made her international debut in the Chinese drama series 夜天子 (Ye Tian Zi, The Dark Lord) in 2018, making the selection over the initial choice of Sunny Leone. She learned Chinese for the role.

In 2019, Srivastava had two releases - Avane Srimannarayana and Geetha which was her first Kannada voice dubbed film.

Media 
Srivastava was ranked in The Times Most Desirable Women at No. 20 in 2019.

Filmography

Awards

References

External links

Living people
Actresses in Telugu cinema
Actresses in Kannada cinema
21st-century Indian actresses
Indian film actresses
Actresses from Uttar Pradesh
1992 births
Actresses in Malayalam cinema